Bradley "Brad" Riethmeyer (born January 14, 1984) is an American former professional stock car racing driver. He has raced in the United States Auto Club (USAC), NASCAR Camping World Truck Series, and the ARCA Racing Series.

Racing career
Riethmeyer began racing in quarter midgets at the age of nine, eventually working his way into super late models owned by his family, including winning the 2003 ROMCO SLM Series Rookie of the Year honors followed by the series championship in 2004, though financial issues threatened to end his operations. In 2005, he entered the All-American Driver Challenge contest with the winner receiving a USAC midget ride from Tracy Trotter. Riethmeyer ultimately won the challenge after defeating the other finalists at Hickory Motor Speedway in March 2006, which allowed him to start competing in the United States Auto Club (USAC) Midget Series. Midget chassis builder and challenge judge Bob East described Riethmeyer as "an extraordinary amount of talent for never stepping foot (sic) in an open-wheel car before."

During his first year in the USAC Midgets, Riethmeyer battled with Chase Scott for the championship. In 2008, he won the USAC Carolina Ford Focus Midget Series title. During his title run, he joined Win-Tron Racing for his maiden ARCA Re/Max Series start at the Illinois State Fairgrounds.

Riethmeyer attempted to make his Truck Series debut in 2006 at Martinsville Speedway for Robert Richardson Racing in an alliance with the All-American Driver Challenge, but failed to qualify. The following season saw his first Truck start at Mansfield Motorsports Park, where he finished 22nd. He joined Reary Racing for the Gateway Motorsports Park race in 2008, finishing 31st with radiator issues. He would not return to the series until 2013 for MAKE Motorsports and Mike Harmon Racing at Martinsville. He exited the race on lap 52 with clutch problems and was classified in 34th.

Personal life
Riethmeyer is an alumnus of Texas A&M University.

Motorsports career results

NASCAR
(key) (Bold – Pole position awarded by qualifying time. Italics – Pole position earned by points standings or practice time. * – Most laps led.)

Camping World Truck Series

 Season still in progress
 Ineligible for series points

ARCA Racing Series
(key) (Bold – Pole position awarded by qualifying time. Italics – Pole position earned by points standings or practice time. * – Most laps led.)

References

External links
 

1984 births
NASCAR drivers
Living people
Racing drivers from Austin, Texas
Racing drivers from Texas
People from Williamson County, Texas
ARCA Menards Series drivers
Texas A&M University alumni